Reading Fairgrounds Speedway (1924–1979) was a one half mile dirt/clay modified race track located in Muhlenberg Township, Berks County, Pennsylvania. The track opened September 24, 1924 and ran until June 29, 1979. It featured a regular weekly series of modified, sportsman modified, and late model stock car racing. The racetrack was replaced by the Fairgrounds Square Mall, which opened in 1980, closed in 2018, and was demolished in 2020.

History 
Lindy V. Vicari was a stock-car racing promoter and operator of the Reading Fairgrounds from 1955 until 1979.

All-Time Victory Leaders 
Kenny Brightbill is the Reading Fairgrounds Speedway all-time wins record holder with 135 track victories. Tommy Hinnershitz had wins at the track early in his career.

,

Reading Modified Top Ten Performance Index

References

Berks County, Pennsylvania
Dirt track racing
Dirt track racing in the United States
Stock car racing